Almudena or La Almudena may refer to:

Almudena (given name), a feminine Spanish given name
Virgin of Almudena, medieval statue of Mary, Mother of Jesus, kept in Madrid
Catedral de la Almudena, in Madrid
Cementerio de la Almudena, the biggest cemetery of Madrid
La Almudena (Madrid Metro), a station

See also
Almudaina, municipality in eastern Spain
Royal Palace of La Almudaina, in Majorca